Anne-Sofie Ernstrøm (born 7 December 1992) is a Danish handball player who currently plays for Aarhus United.

References

1992 births
Living people
People from Ikast-Brande Municipality
Danish female handball players
Youth Olympic gold medalists for Denmark
Sportspeople from the Central Denmark Region